The Turkey national under-16 and under-17 basketball team is the national representative for Turkey in men's international under-16 and under-17 basketball tournaments. They are formed and run by the Turkish Basketball Federation. The team competes at the FIBA U16 European Championship, with the opportunity to qualify for the FIBA Under-17 World Cup.

FIBA U16 European Championship

FIBA Under-17 World Cup

See also
Turkey men's national under-18 and under-19 basketball team
Turkey men's national under-20 basketball team
Turkey men's national basketball team

References

External links
Official website 
FIBA profile

Men's U16 U17
 
Men's national under-16 basketball teams
Men's national under-17 basketball teams